John Morris (born 29 July 1980), is an Australian professional rugby league coach who was the head coach of the Cronulla Sutherland Sharks in the NRL, and a former professional rugby league footballer.

Morris was selected on the bench for Country Origin to play City Origin in 2002 and 2003.

Background
Morris was born in Scone, New South Wales, Australia. He is the uncle of Cronulla Sharks player Teig Wilton.

Playing career
Morris played for the Scone Thoroughbreds in his junior years. He made his NRL debut in round 17 of the 2001 NRL season for the Newcastle Knights against the Parramatta Eels at Parramatta Stadium on 22 June 2001. 

Having won the 2001 NRL Premiership, the Newcastle club travelled to England to play the 2002 World Club Challenge against Super League champions, the Bradford Bulls. Morris was selected to play from the interchange bench in Newcastle's loss. 

Morris played for NSW Country in 2002 and in 2003. Between 2003 and 2006, Morris played for Parramatta primarily at five-eighth and won the Minor Premiership with the club in the 2005 NRL season. Morris played in Parramatta's 2005 shock 0-29 preliminary final defeat by North Queensland.

In 2007, Morris switched from Parramatta to the Wests Tigers on a three-year contract. He was bought as a replacement for the recently departed Scott Prince. He played 72 games for the Tigers during this period, never missing a game.

In 2009 he signed a two-year deal with the Cronulla-Sutherland Sharks commencing in 2010.  In the 2013 finals series, Morris pulled off a try saving tackle on North Queensland player Kane Linnett in the final seconds of play as Cronulla-Sutherland won 20–18 at the Sydney Football Stadium.

On 26 May 2014, Morris played his 300th NRL career game against the South Sydney Rabbitohs with the match finishing in an 18–0 loss at Shark Park.
Morris played 11 games in the 2014 NRL season which would be his last as a player.  Cronulla finished the year bottom of the table and claimed the Wooden Spoon.

Coaching career

Cronulla-Sutherland Sharks
In 2017, Morris became the new NYC coach for Cronulla and guided the side to the minor premiership before crashing out of the finals series.  At the end of 2017, Morris was named NYC coach of the season.  On 3 January 2019, Morris was named interim head coach of Cronulla after Shane Flanagan was de-registered by the NRL for breaching conditions of a suspension handed down in 2014.

On 31 January 2019, it was announced that Morris would be Cronulla's new full time coach going into the 2019 season.

In his first season as Cronulla coach, Morris guided the club to a 7th-placed finish at the end of the 2019 regular season.  Cronulla were eliminated from the finals in the first week losing to Manly 28–16 at Brookvale Oval.

In the 2020 NRL season, Morris guided Cronulla to an 8th-placed finish and qualified for the finals.  The club were eliminated in the first week of the finals by Canberra.

On the 13 April 2021, it was announced Morris would leave Cronulla-Sutherland effective immediately with Josh Hannay to take over for the rest of the 2021 season pending the arrival of Sydney Roosters assistant coach Craig Fitzgibbon as the new head coach starting in 2022.

References

External links

Cronulla Sharks profile
John Morris at Wests Tigers
John Morris at The Rugby League Project

1980 births
Living people
Australian rugby league coaches
Country New South Wales Origin rugby league team players
Cronulla-Sutherland Sharks coaches
Cronulla-Sutherland Sharks players
Newcastle Knights players
Parramatta Eels players
Rugby league five-eighths
Rugby league halfbacks
Rugby league hookers
Rugby league players from Scone, New South Wales
Scone Thoroughbreds players
Wests Tigers players